The spot-necked babbler (Stachyris strialata) is a species of bird in the family Timaliidae.

It is found in China, Indonesia, Laos, Myanmar, Thailand, and Vietnam. Its natural habitats are subtropical or tropical moist lowland forest and subtropical or tropical moist montane forest.

References

Collar, N. J. & Robson, C. 2007. Family Timaliidae (Babblers)  pp. 70–291 in; del Hoyo, J., Elliott, A. & Christie, D.A. eds. Handbook of the Birds of the World, Vol. 12. Picathartes to Tits and Chickadees. Lynx Edicions, Barcelona.

spot-necked babbler
Birds of Hainan
Birds of Laos
Birds of Sumatra
Birds of Thailand
Birds of Southeast Asia
spot-necked babbler
Taxonomy articles created by Polbot